Ihor Buryak (born 12 January 1983) is a professional Ukrainian football defender who plays for Kyzyltash Bakhchisaray.

Career
He played for Hirnyk Kryvyi Rih. His previous club was FC Chornomorets Odesa where he moved in June 2010 from FC Tavriya Simferopol. Buryak also played for such clubs as Metalurh Donetsk, Arsenal Kharkiv (later renamed FC Kharkiv), lllychivets Mariupol, and FC Dniester Ovidiopol.

External links
 Profile on Football Squads
 
 
 
 Ihor Buryak at CFU

1983 births
Living people
Footballers from Kyiv
Ukrainian footballers
Ukrainian footballers banned from domestic competitions
Association football defenders
Ukrainian expatriate footballers
Expatriate footballers in Kazakhstan
Expatriate footballers in Belarus
Expatriate footballers in Germany
Ukrainian expatriate sportspeople in Kazakhstan
Ukrainian expatriate sportspeople in Belarus
Ukrainian expatriate sportspeople in Germany
FC Sachsen Leipzig players
FC Metalurh Donetsk players
FC Metalurh-2 Donetsk players
FC Kharkiv players
FC Mariupol players
FC Dnister Ovidiopol players
SC Tavriya Simferopol players
FC Chornomorets Odesa players
FC Vostok players
FC Naftan Novopolotsk players
FC Hirnyk Kryvyi Rih players
FC TSK Simferopol players
FC Kyzyltash Bakhchisaray players
Crimean Premier League players